The 1990 Barking and Dagenham Borough Council election took place on 3 May 1990 to elect members of Barking and Dagenham London Borough Council in London, England. The whole council was up for election and the Labour Party stayed overwhelmingly in overall control of the council.

Background
102 candidates nominated in total. Labour again ran a full slate and was the only party to do so. By contrast the Conservative Party ran only 33 candidates whilst the Liberal Democrats and the Liberal Democratic Focus Team ran a combined 17.

Election result
Labour continued to win a large majority of seats - 44 out of 48. The Residents Association held their 3 seats. The Liberal Democratic Focus Team won 1 seat.

Ward results

Abbey

Alibon

Cambell

Chadwell Heath

Eastbrook

Eastbury

Fanshawe

Gascoigne

Goresbrook

Heath

Longbridge

Manor

Marks Gate

Parsloes

River

Thames

Triptons

Valence

Village

By-elections between 1990 and 1994

Alibon

The by-election was called following the resignation of Cllr. Trevor A. Watson.

Chadwell Heath

The by-election was called following the death of Cllr. Raymond Gowland.

References

1990
Barking and Dagenham